Brother, I Cry is a Canadian drama film, directed by Jessie Anthony and released in 2020. The film stars Justin Rain as Jon, a young First Nations man struggling with drug addiction.

The film's cast also includes Lauren Hill, Violet Cameron, Jay Cardinal Villeneuve, Eric Schweig, Odessa Shuquaya, Joe Buffalo, Sarah Kelley, Lesley Mirza and Loren Anthony.

Anthony wrote the film while studying at Capilano University, before being accepted into Telefilm Canada's Talent to Watch program. It was shot in the Vancouver area in 2018.

The film premiered at the 2020 Vancouver International Film Festival, where Anthony won the award for British Columbia Emerging Filmmaker. The film subsequently won the Audience Choice award at the 2020 ImagineNATIVE Film and Media Arts Festival.

References

External links

2020 films
2020 drama films
Canadian drama films
Films shot in Vancouver
Films set in Vancouver
First Nations films
Films about addiction
2020s English-language films
2020s Canadian films